The Macau New Urban Zone is a   currently under land reclamation in Macau, China, that has not yet been assigned to any of the freguesias.

Districts
Macau New Urban Zone will be divided into 5 districts:

Completed 
 A - Eastern side from Outer Harbour Ferry Terminal to the north end of Avenida da Ponte de Amizade
 B - Southern side of Avenida da Dr. Sun Yat-sen (now part of Sé)
 E1 - Western side of Taipa Ferry Terminal
 E2 - Eastern side of Taipa Ferry Terminal (now part of Nossa Senhora do Carmo)

Under reclamation
 C - Northern side of Avenida dos Jardins do Oceano (between Ponte de Sai Van and Ponte Governador Nobre de Carvalho)

Cancelled
 D - Northern side of Altira Macau (between Ponte Governador Nobre de Carvalho and Ponte de Amizade)

See also
 Cotai
 Geography of Macau

References

Populated coastal places in Macau